The 1999 Northern Iowa Panthers football team represented the University of Northern Iowa as a member of the Gateway Football Conference dring the 1999 NCAA Division I-AA football season. In its third season under head coach Mike Dunbar, the team compiled a 8–3 record overall and 3–3 mark against Gateway opponents.

The team's statistical leaders included Ryan Helming with 3,469 passing yards, Mike Furrey with 1,179 receiving yards, and Adam Benge with 778 rushing yards.

Schedule

Roster

Team players drafted in the NFL
The following players were selected in the 2000 NFL Draft.

References

Northern Iowa
Northern Iowa Panthers football seasons
Northern Iowa Panthers football